Rune Hammarström (November 16, 1920 – May 3, 1999) was a Swedish speed skater who competed in the 1948 Winter Olympics.

In 1948 he finished ninth in the 10000 metres competition and 16th in the 5000 metres event.

References

External links
 Speed skating 1948 

1920 births
1999 deaths
Swedish male speed skaters
Olympic speed skaters of Sweden
Speed skaters at the 1948 Winter Olympics
20th-century Swedish people